Top Gun is a 1986 American action drama film directed by Tony Scott, produced by Don Simpson and Jerry Bruckheimer, with distribution by Paramount Pictures. The screenplay was written by Jim Cash and Jack Epps Jr., and was inspired by an article titled "Top Guns", written by Ehud Yonay and published in California magazine three years earlier. It stars Tom Cruise as Lieutenant Pete "Maverick" Mitchell, a young naval aviator aboard the aircraft carrier . He and his radar intercept officer, Lieutenant (junior grade) Nick "Goose" Bradshaw (Anthony Edwards), are given the chance to train at the United States Navy's Fighter Weapons School (Top Gun) at Naval Air Station Miramar in San Diego, California. Kelly McGillis, Val Kilmer and Tom Skerritt also appear in supporting roles.

Top Gun was released on May 16, 1986. Upon its release, the film received mixed reviews from film critics, but despite this, its visual effects and soundtrack were universally acclaimed. Four weeks after its release, the number of theaters showing it increased by 45 percent. Despite its initial mixed critical reaction, the film was a huge commercial hit, grossing $357 million globally against a production budget of $15 million. Top Gun was the highest-grossing domestic film of 1986. The film maintained its popularity over the years and earned an IMAX 3D re-release in 2013. Additionally, the soundtrack to the film has since become one of the most popular movie soundtracks to date, reaching 9× Platinum certification. The film won both an Academy Award and a Golden Globe for "Take My Breath Away" performed by Berlin. In 2015, the United States Library of Congress selected the film for preservation in the National Film Registry, finding it "culturally, historically, or aesthetically significant". A sequel, Top Gun: Maverick, was released 36 years later on May 27, 2022, and surpassed the original film both critically and commercially.

Plot 

During an interception with two hostile MiG-28s, Maverick missile-locks on one, while the other hostile locks onto Maverick's wingman, Cougar. Maverick drives it off, but Cougar is so shaken that Maverick defies orders to land and shepherds him back to the carrier. Cougar resigns his commission. Maverick and Goose are sent in his place by CAG "Stinger" to attend Top Gun, the Naval Fighter Weapons School at Naval Air Station Miramar.

Before the first day of instruction, Maverick unsuccessfully approaches a woman at a bar. He learns the next day she is an astrophysicist and civilian Top Gun instructor, Charlotte "Charlie" Blackwood. She becomes interested in Maverick upon learning of his inverted maneuver with a MiG-28. In Maverick's first training hop, he flies below , breaking a major rule of engagement, to defeat instructor Lieutenant Commander Rick "Jester" Heatherly. Maverick and Goose also buzz the control tower when specifically told not to do so. They are reprimanded by chief instructor Commander Mike "Viper" Metcalf.

Privately, Jester tells Viper that while he admires Maverick's skill, he is not sure if he would trust him as a teammate in combat. In class, Charlie objects to Maverick's aggressive tactics against the MiG-28, but privately tells him she admires his flying; they begin a romantic relationship.

On training Hop 19, Maverick abandons his wingman "Hollywood" to chase Viper. As a result, first Hollywood and then Maverick are defeated in a demonstration of the value of teamwork. Jester tells Maverick his flying is excellent, but criticizes him for leaving his wingman. Maverick’s rival, Lieutenant Tom "Iceman" Kazansky, calls his behavior "foolish", "dangerous", and worse than the enemy, to which Maverick responds "I am dangerous". 

Maverick and Iceman, the leading contenders for the Top Gun Trophy, chase an A-4 in Hop 31. As Iceman has trouble getting a lock on the A-4, Maverick pressures him to break off so that he can move into firing position. However, Maverick's F-14 flies through Iceman's jet wash and suffers a flameout of both engines, going into an unrecoverable flat spin. Maverick and Goose eject, but Goose fatally slams into the jettisoned aircraft canopy.

The board of inquiry clears Maverick of any wrongdoing, but he is shaken and guilt-ridden, and considers quitting. He seeks advice from Viper, who flew with Maverick's father in the Vietnam War air battle where he was killed. Contrary to official reports faulting Mitchell, Viper says he died heroically. He tells him he can succeed if he regains his self-confidence. Maverick chooses to graduate and congratulates Iceman, who has won the Top Gun Trophy. Iceman, Hollywood, and Maverick receive immediate deployment orders to deal with a crisis situation; they are sent to the Enterprise to provide air support for the rescue of the SS Layton, a disabled communication ship that drifted into hostile waters.

Aboard Enterprise, Iceman and Hollywood are assigned to provide air cover, with Maverick and RIO Merlin on standby. Iceman expresses his concerns to Stinger about Maverick's mental state, but is told to just do his job. Iceman and Hollywood are pulled into a dogfight with what first appear to be two MiGs, but turn out to be six. After Hollywood is shot down, Maverick is scrambled. He goes into a spin after encountering another jet wash, but recovers. Shaken, he breaks off, but then re-engages and shoots down three MiGs. Iceman destroys a fourth, and the remaining two MiGs withdraw. Upon their triumphant return to Enterprise, the pilots share their newfound respect for one another. Finally confident and able to let go of the guilt caused by the training accident, Maverick later throws Goose's dog tags overboard.

Offered the choice of any assignment, Maverick chooses to return to Top Gun as an instructor. He and Charlie reunite at a bar in Miramar.

Cast 

 Tom Cruise as LT Pete "Maverick" Mitchell: A U.S. Navy pilot. The character was loosely based on Duke Cunningham and his accomplishments during the Vietnam War.
 Kelly McGillis as Charlotte "Charlie" Blackwood: Instructor of Top Gun and Maverick's love interest. The character is based on a real-life person, Christine Fox, who worked at Naval Air Station Miramar.
 Val Kilmer as LT Tom "Iceman" Kazansky: One of Top Gun's students and Maverick's rival turned wingman. 
 Anthony Edwards as LTJG Nick "Goose" Bradshaw: Maverick's radar intercept officer and best friend.
 Tom Skerritt as CDR Mike "Viper" Metcalf: Commanding officer and instructor of Top Gun. A veteran of the Vietnam War who served with Duke Mitchell, Maverick's father. The character was based on a real person: Rear Admiral Pete "Viper" Pettigrew, a former Navy aviator, Vietnam War veteran and Top Gun instructor, who served as a technical advisor on the film and also makes a cameo appearance in the film as a colleague of Charlie's.

 Michael Ironside as LCDR Rick "Jester" Heatherly: A Naval Aviator, and Top Gun instructor
 John Stockwell as LT Bill "Cougar" Cortell: Maverick's former wingman
 Barry Tubb as LTJG Leonard "Wolfman" Wolfe: Hollywood's radar intercept officer
 Rick Rossovich as LTJG Ron "Slider" Kerner: Iceman's radar intercept officer
 Tim Robbins as LTJG Sam "Merlin" Wells: Cougar's radar intercept officer (later Maverick's during the climax)
 Clarence Gilyard as LTJG Marcus "Sundown" Williams: Chipper's radar intercept officer (later Maverick's during the end of training)

 Whip Hubley as LT Rick "Hollywood" Neven: A student from Top Gun and Iceman's wingman during the climax
 James Tolkan as CDR Tom "Stinger" Jardian: Commander of the USS Enterprise Carrier Air Group
 Meg Ryan as Carole Bradshaw (wife of LTJG Nick "Goose" Bradshaw)

 Adrian Pasdar as LT Charles "Chipper" Piper: A Naval Aviator and student of Top Gun
 Aaron and Adam Weis as Bradley Bradshaw: Goose and Carole's son (uncredited)

Production

Development 
The primary inspiration for the film was the article "Top Guns" by Ehud Yonay, from the May 1983 issue of California magazine, which featured aerial photography by then-Lieutenant Commander Charles "Heater" Heatley. The article detailed the life of fighter pilots at Naval Air Station Miramar in San Diego, self-nicknamed as "Fightertown USA". Numerous screenwriters allegedly turned down the project. Bruckheimer and Simpson went on to hire Jim Cash and Jack Epps Jr., to write the first draft. The research methods, by Epps, included attendance at several declassified Top Gun classes at Miramar and gaining experience by being flown in an F-14. The first draft failed to impress Bruckheimer and Simpson, and is considered to be very different from the final product in numerous ways. Tony Scott was hired to direct on the strength of a commercial he had done for Swedish automaker Saab in the early 1980s, where a Saab 900 turbo is shown racing a Saab 37 Viggen fighter jet.

Actor Matthew Modine turned down the role of Pete Mitchell because he felt the film's pro-military stance went against his politics. The producers wanted Tom Cruise for the role after seeing him in Risky Business. Cruise was offered the part while he was in London filming  Legend, Cruise was reluctant to take the part but Tony's brother Ridley Scott convinced him to take the part. Julianne Phillips was in consideration for the role of Charlie, and had been scheduled to perform a screen test opposite Tom Cruise.

The producers wanted the assistance of the U.S. Navy in the production of the film. The Navy was influential in relation to script approval, which resulted in changes being made. The opening dogfight was moved to international waters as opposed to Cuba, the language was toned down, and a scene that involved a crash on the deck of an aircraft carrier was also scrapped. Maverick's love interest was also changed from a female enlisted member of the Navy to a civilian contractor with the Navy, due to the U.S. military's prohibition of fraternization between officers and enlisted personnel. The "Charlie" character also replaced an aerobics instructor from an early draft as a love interest for Maverick after producers were introduced to Christine "Legs" Fox, a civilian mathematician employed by the Center for Naval Analyses as a specialist in Maritime Air Superiority (MAS), developing tactics for aircraft carrier defense.

Filming 

Filming began in Oceanside, California on June 26, 1985, with it later moving to Miramar to begin shooting scenes on the aircraft. The Navy made several aircraft from F-14 fighter squadron VF-51 "Screaming Eagles" (which Mike "Viper" Metcalf mentions in the scene at his home) available for the film. Paramount paid as much as US$7,800 per hour (equivalent to $ in 2021) for fuel and other operating costs whenever aircraft were flown outside their normal duties. Shots of the aircraft carrier sequences were filmed aboard USS Enterprise, showing aircraft from F-14 squadrons VF-114 "Aardvarks" and VF-213 "Blacklions". The majority of the carrier flight deck shots were of normal aircraft operations and the film crew had to take what they could get, save for the occasional flyby which the film crew would request. During filming, director Tony Scott wanted to film aircraft landing and taking off, back-lit by the sun. During one particular filming sequence, the ship's commanding officer changed the ship's course, thus changing the light. When Scott asked if they could continue on their previous course and speed, he was informed by the commander that it cost US$25,000 (equivalent to $ in 2021) to turn the ship, and to continue on course. Scott wrote the carrier's captain a check so that the ship could be turned and he could continue shooting for another five minutes.

Future NASA astronaut Scott Altman piloted F-14 aircraft for many of the film's stunt sequences, having been recently stationed at NAS Miramar at time of filming. Altman was the pilot seen "flipping the bird" in the film's well-known opening sequence, as well as piloting the aircraft shown "buzzing the tower" throughout the film.

Most of the sequences of the aircraft maneuvering over land were shot at Naval Air Station Fallon, in Nevada, using ground-mounted cameras. Air-to-air shots were filmed using a Learjet, piloted by Astrovision inventor and legendary pilot Clay Lacy (his name is misspelled in the closing credits, as "Clay Lacey"). Grumman, manufacturer of the F-14, was commissioned by Paramount Pictures to create camera pods to be placed upon the aircraft that could be pointed toward either the front or rear of the aircraft providing outside shots at high altitude.

The fictitious MIG-28 enemy aircraft was depicted by the Northrop F-5.

The film was shot in the Super 35 format, as anamorphic lenses were too large to fit inside the cockpits of the fighter jets and also the cameras would fall off their mounts when the fighter jets maneuvered on their sides.

Reshoots after Top Guns filming wrapped conflicted with Made in Heaven, in which McGillis starred with brown hair. Top Gun filmmakers were forced to hide her hair color, which for example resulted that the scene shot in an elevator featured McGillis in a baseball cap.

The San Diego restaurant and bar Kansas City Barbeque served as a filming location for two scenes shot in July 1985. The first scene features Goose and Maverick singing "Great Balls of Fire" while seated at the piano. The final scene, where "You've Lost That Lovin' Feelin'" can be heard on the restaurant's Wurlitzer jukebox, was also filmed at the restaurant. Both scenes were filmed consecutively. After the release of the movie, the restaurant went on to collect a significant amount of memorabilia from the motion picture until a kitchen fire on June 26, 2008, destroyed much of the restaurant. Some memorabilia and props, including the original piano used in the film, survived the fire, and the restaurant re-opened in November 2008.

In 1985, Paramount Pictures rented The Graves House, a historic San Diego Folk Victorian/Queen Anne cottage located at 102 North Pacific Street, and used it as the home for Charlotte ‘Charlie’ Blackwood. Charlie's backyard scenes were filmed at another house located at 112 First Street (Seagaze Drive) that was behind The Graves House. In May 2020, The Graves House was relocated and later renovated into a pie shop called High Pie located at 250 North Pacific Street.

Renowned aerobatic pilot Art Scholl was hired to do in-flight camera work for the film. The original script called for a flat spin, which Scholl was to perform and capture on a camera on the aircraft. The aircraft was observed to spin through its recovery altitude, at which time Scholl radioed "I have a problem... I have a real problem". He was unable to recover from the spin and crashed his Pitts Special biplane into the Pacific Ocean off the Southern California coast near Carlsbad on September 16, 1985. Neither Scholl's body nor his aircraft were recovered, leaving the official cause of the accident unknown. Top Gun was dedicated to Scholl's memory.

Music 

The Top Gun soundtrack is one of the most popular soundtracks to date, reaching 9× Platinum certification and No. 1 on the Billboard 200 albums chart for five non-consecutive weeks in the summer and fall of 1986. Harold Faltermeyer, who previously worked with both Jerry Bruckheimer and Don Simpson on Beverly Hills Cop, was sent the script of Top Gun by Bruckheimer before filming began. Giorgio Moroder and Tom Whitlock worked on numerous songs including the Oscar-winning "Take My Breath Away". Kenny Loggins performed two songs on the soundtrack, "Playing with the Boys", and "Danger Zone". Berlin recorded the song "Take My Breath Away", which would later win numerous awards, sending the band to international acclaim. After the release of Loggins's single "Danger Zone", sales of the album exploded, selling 7 million in the United States alone. On the re-release of the soundtrack in 2000, two songs that had been omitted from the original album (and had been released many years before the film was made), "Great Balls of Fire" by Jerry Lee Lewis and "You've Lost That Lovin' Feelin'" by The Righteous Brothers, were added. The soundtrack also includes "Top Gun Anthem" and "Memories" by Faltermeyer, with Steve Stevens also performing on the former.

Other artists were considered for the soundtrack project but did not participate. Bryan Adams was considered as a potential candidate but refused to participate because he felt the film glorified war. The band Toto was originally meant to record "Danger Zone", and had also written and recorded a song "Only You" for the soundtrack. However, there was a dispute between Toto's lawyers and the producers of the film, paving the way for Loggins to record "Danger Zone" and "Only You" being omitted from the film entirely.

Release

Theatrical
The film's premiere was held in New York City on May 12, 1986, with another held in San Diego on May 15.

The film opened in the United States and Canada in 1,028 theaters on May 16, 1986, a week prior to the Memorial Day weekend, which was considered a gamble at the time.

Home media 
In addition to its box office success, Top Gun went on to break further records in the then still-developing home video market. It was the first new-release blockbuster on video cassette to be priced as low as $26.95 and, backed by a massive $8 million marketing campaign, including a Top Gun-themed Diet Pepsi commercial, the advance demand was such that the film became the best-selling videocassette in the industry's history on pre-orders alone, with over 1.9 million units ordered before its launch on March 10, 1987. It eventually sold a record 2.9 million units.

The film was first released in the U.S. on DVD under Paramount Pictures on October 21, 1998, and included the film in both Widescreen (non-anamorphic Univisium 2.00:1) and Full Screen (open matte) versions. Top Gun's home video success was again reflected by strong DVD sales, which were furthered by a Special Collector's Edition 2-disc DVD release on December 14, 2004, in both Widescreen (anamorphic 2.39:1) and Full Screen (open matte) versions, that include new bonus features. Special features comprise audio commentary by Bruckheimer, Tony Scott and naval experts, four music videos including the "Top Gun Anthem" and "Take My Breath Away", a six-part documentary on the making of Top Gun, and vintage gallery with interviews, behind-the-scenes and survival training featurettes.

Subsequently, the film was first released on a Special Collector's Edition Blu-ray disc on July 29, 2008, with the same supplemental features as the previous 2004 DVD. A 2-disc limited edition 3D copy was issued on February 19, 2013. The remastered Blu-ray and Digital Copy version of the film was released on May 19, 2019, on Paramount Movies.
Top Gun was released in the U.S. on remastered Blu-ray and 4K Ultra HD on May 19, 2020, with two new special features titled The Legacy of Top Gun and On Your Six: Thirty Years of Top Gun, with the remaining bonus features being carried over.

Top Gun reached number one on the U.K. Official Film Chart based on DVD, Blu-ray and download sales on the week ending May 31, 2022.

IMAX 3D re-release 
Top Gun was re-released in IMAX 3D on February 8, 2013, for six days. A four-minute preview of the conversion, featuring the "Danger Zone" flight sequence, was screened at the 2012 International Broadcasting Convention in Amsterdam, Netherlands.

2021 re-release
Top Gun was re-released in Dolby Cinema and screened by AMC Theatres on 153 screens on May 13, 2021. On the first weekend it grossed a total of $248,000 ranking at number 10. It grossed a total of $433,000 in a ten-day period.

Reception

Box office 
The film quickly became a success and was the highest-grossing film of 1986. It would be six months before its theater count dropped below that of its opening week. It was number one on its first weekend with a gross of $8.2 million, and went on to a total domestic gross of $176.8 million, and $177 million internationally, for a worldwide box office total of $353.8 million. The film sold an estimated 47.65 million tickets in North America in its initial theatrical run.

The film grossed an additional $3 million in its IMAX re-release in 2013, and an additional $471,982 in its 2021 re-release, bringing its domestic gross to $180.3 million and its worldwide gross to $357.3 million.

Critical response 
On Rotten Tomatoes the film has an approval rating of 58% based on reviews from 76 critics, with an average rating of 6.0/10. The website's critical consensus states: "Though it features some of the most memorable and electrifying aerial footage shot with an expert eye for action, Top Gun offers too little for non-adolescent viewers to chew on when its characters aren't in the air." On Metacritic, the film has a weighted average score of 50 out of 100 based on 15 critics, indicating "mixed or average reviews". Audiences surveyed by CinemaScore gave the film an average grade of "A" on an A+ to F scale.

Roger Ebert of the Chicago Sun-Times gave the film 2.5 out of 4 stars, saying that "Movies like Top Gun are hard to review because the good parts are so good and the bad parts are so relentless. The dogfights are absolutely the best since Clint Eastwood's electrifying aerial scenes in Firefox. But look out for the scenes where the people talk to one another." Gene Siskel of the Chicago Tribune gave the film 3 out of 4 stars, praising the action sequences but criticizing the romantic subplot, writing that "it belongs in a teenage sex-fantasy film and not in a movie that deserves the genuine romantic value of An Officer and a Gentleman". American film critic Pauline Kael commented, "When McGillis is offscreen, the movie is a shiny homoerotic commercial: the pilots strut around the locker room, towels hanging precariously from their waists. It's as if masculinity had been redefined as how a young man looks with his clothes half off, and as if narcissism is what being a warrior is all about."

Some critics have said that the film promotes American jingoism. Filmmaker Oliver Stone told Playboy that the film "sold the idea that war is clean, war can be won … nobody in the movie ever mentions that he just started World War Three!" In 1990, Tom Cruise, while promoting Stone's Born on the Fourth of July, said the film should be taken as a "fairy tale" instead of real depiction of wars and added that it would have been irresponsible to make a sequel because the film gave a misleading view of war. Cruise reprised his role in the sequel 36 years later, this time to mostly positive reviews. Val Kilmer, who was critical of warmongering in the first film, also returned for the sequel.

Journalist and former F-14 RIO Ward Carroll considered the movie iconic and culturally relevant, even jokingly referring to it as "the greatest movie ever made". But while conceding the need for narrative and cinematographic liberties, he felt that the film had several "cringe-worthy technical errors that cause it to be as much cartoon as tribute". Carroll identified 79 departures from naval aviation procedure, technical mistakes, and continuity errors in a 2019 article for Military.com.

Accolades

 In 2008, the film was ranked at number 455 in Empires list of the 500 greatest films of all time.
 Yahoo! Movies ranked Top Gun number 19 on their list of greatest action films of all-time.

American Film Institute list
AFI's 100 Years...100 Movie Quotes:
"I feel the need—the need for speed." – #94

Influence 
Film producer John Davis said that Top Gun was a recruiting video for the Navy, and that people saw the movie and said, "Wow! I want to be a pilot." The Navy had recruitment booths in some theaters to attract enthusiastic patrons. After the film's release, a popular claim arose that the number of young men who joined the Navy wanting to be naval aviators went up by 500%; however, its accuracy has since been disputed, with modern analyses indicating a more modest enlistment increase of 8%.

The U.S. Department of Defense Office of Inspector General blamed sexist behavior depicted in Top Gun for making sexual assault more likely in the real-life military, contributing to the Tailhook scandal in 1991.

In popular culture 

The 1991 film Hot Shots! was a comedy spoof of Top Gun.

Top Gun is one of many war and action films, especially those by Bruckheimer, parodied in the 2004 comedy Team America: World Police.

Top Gun, along with A Few Good Men, is recognized for being an inspiration for the TV series JAG and the subsequent NCIS franchise in turn. JAG and NCIS are also owned by Paramount.

The DisneyToon Studios film Planes (2013) pays homage to Top Gun with Kilmer and Edwards appearing in the film as part of the voice cast.

Two Chinese war films, 2011's Jian Shi Chu Ji ("Skyfighters") and 2017's Kong Tian Lie ("Sky Hunter"), were based on Top Gun. On January 23, 2011, China's state broadcaster China Central Television published a TV news story about the alleged efficiency of Chinese fighter pilots which incorporated footage from the Top Gun action sequences. Chinese internet users noticed the plagiarism, whereupon the broadcast was immediately withdrawn. The CCTV has declined comments on this incident.

Sequel 

A sequel had been in active development since at least 2010. By September 2014, it was revealed that Justin Marks was in negotiations to write the screenplay, which was confirmed that following June. In May 2017, during the promotional tour for The Mummy, Cruise confirmed that a sequel to Top Gun would start filming in 2018. By June of the same year, he said that the title would be Top Gun: Maverick, with Faltermeyer returning as composer for the sequel. Scott was originally going to return to direct the sequel, but later died of suicide on August 19, 2012. Later that month, it was announced that Joseph Kosinski, who directed Cruise in 2013's Oblivion, was set to direct and replacing Scott, with Maverick being dedicated to Scott's memory, and Kilmer was announced to reprise his role as Iceman. McGillis was not asked to return for the sequel, but appears in the film via archive footage. The Bradshaw family—Edwards, Ryan and the Weis twins—also appear via archive footage, while Miles Teller plays their grown-up son, Lt. Bradley "Rooster" Bradshaw. The film was released on May 27, 2022, to critical and commercial success.

Video games 

Top Gun also spawned a number of video games for various platforms. The original game was released in 1986 under the same title as the film. It was released on Commodore 64, ZX Spectrum, Amstrad CPC, and Atari ST. Another game, also titled Top Gun, was released in 1987 for Nintendo Entertainment System (NES) and Nintendo VS. System arcade cabinets. In the 1987 game, the player pilots an F-14 Tomcat fighter, and has to complete four missions. A sequel, Top Gun: The Second Mission, was released for the NES three years later.

Another game, Top Gun: Fire at Will, was released in 1996 for the PC and later for the Sony PlayStation platform. Top Gun: Hornet's Nest was released in 1998. Top Gun: Combat Zones was released for PlayStation 2 in 2001 and was subsequently released for the GameCube and Microsoft Windows. Combat Zones features other aircraft besides the F-14. In 2006, another game simply titled Top Gun was released for the Nintendo DS. A 2010 game, also titled Top Gun, retells the film's story. At E3 2011, a new game was announced, Top Gun: Hard Lock, which was released in March 2012 for Xbox 360, PC, and PlayStation 3.

Notes

See also 
 List of media set in San Diego

References

External links 

 
 
 
 'Top Gun' 30th Anniversary Exclusive Art Work on Fandango
 
 
 Top Gun at Box Office Mojo
 Paramount Movies
 Patch Wearers: The Real Top Gun documentary

 
1986 films
1980s action adventure films
1980s action drama films
2013 3D films
American aviation films
American action adventure films
American action drama films
Films that won the Best Original Song Academy Award
Cold War aviation films
Films about aviators
1980s English-language films
Films based on newspaper and magazine articles
Films produced by Don Simpson
Films directed by Tony Scott
Films produced by Jerry Bruckheimer
Films set in San Diego
Films set in the Indian Ocean
Films shot in San Diego
IMAX films
Paramount Pictures films
Films about naval aviation
Films about the United States Navy
United States National Film Registry films
Films scored by Harold Faltermeyer
Films scored by Giorgio Moroder
3D re-releases
1986 drama films
Films set on aircraft carriers
1980s American films